Will Robson Emilio Andrade (born 15 December 1973), known as just Will, is a former Brazilian football player.

Clubs
Will played for Atlético Paranaense in Brazil, before moving to play in Japan. He spent three seasons in the J2 League with Oita Trinita from 1998 to 2000. Next, he joined Consadole Sapporo, where he was the 2001 J. League's top scorer with 24 goals. He spent the following season on loan with Yokohama F. Marinos, who sacked him for kicking teammate, Daisuke Oku, during a match. He joined Oita Trinita for the next season, before returning to Consadole Sapporo for the 2004 season. Will also played for Wuhan Guanggu.

Club statistics

Honors

Individual honors
 J1 League Top Scorer : 2001
 J1 League Best Eleven: 2001
 China League One Top Scorer: 2004

References

External links

1973 births
Living people
Brazilian footballers
Brazilian expatriate footballers
Club Athletico Paranaense players
Clube do Remo players
Oita Trinita players
Hokkaido Consadole Sapporo players
Yokohama F. Marinos players
Expatriate footballers in Japan
Expatriate footballers in Qatar
J1 League players
J2 League players
Japan Football League (1992–1998) players
Association football forwards
Footballers from São Paulo